Vannappuram  is a village in the Idukki district of state Kerala in India . The village is in the highland regions 28 km east of Muvattupuzha Town and lies north of the Kaliyar River.

Demographics
 the India census records Vannappuram had a population of 27449 with 13792 males and 13657 females.

References

Villages in Idukki district